BattleCreek Church is the name and main campus of a rapidly growing, multi-site,  evangelical church in Broken Arrow, Tulsa County, Oklahoma notable for its rapid growth. As of December, 2014, the Church drew 6,000 Christians to weekly worship services on multiple campuses, including new sites in Chicago, Illinois and Cairo, Egypt.

History
In 2002, approximately 100 remaining members of Gracemont Baptist Church in Broken Arrow, Oklahoma, a suburb of Tulsa, asked Dr. Alex Himaya to accept a position as Senior Pastor and to help revitalize the church. Due to a series of events, the Gracemont congregation experienced a serious decline in membership. At the time the remaining members of the congregation found themselves in possession of a large meeting space (originally built as an Outlet mall but acquired by Gracemont during a period of growth in the 1980s) and an equally large mortgage.

Pastor Himaya was reared in Louisiana, the child of an Egyptian father and a North Carolina-born mother.  He was called to Battle Creek from a church in Arkansas in 2002.  Church members planned to make 11 fellowship visits to churches in Egypt in 2015.

Dr. Himaya agreed to accept the position with the understanding that the church would essentially dissolve and reorganize as a new congregation with a new name, new ministry efforts, and a strong emphasis on evangelism. Dr. Himaya set the direction for the church during an initial meeting when he stated: "Tulsa does not need another church. What Tulsa does need is a safe environment where the unchurched can come and hear the life-changing truth that Jesus Christ cares for them and died for their sin."  
Soon after, the congregation incorporated as "The Church at BattleCreek."  Broken Arrow continues to be the largest campus of the rapidly growing Church, described as one of the fastest-growing churches in the country.

The Church at BattleCreek held its initial public service on August 14, 2003.  As of the church's third anniversary in August 2006, it was reporting weekly attendance at two Sunday morning services of over 1600 people, including over 700 children and teenagers. The church had also retired its mortgage debt and the staff of the church had expanded to include five full-time pastors, and several other full and part-time employees.  Additionally, The Church at BattleCreek was operating a daily preschool and providing meeting space and financial support to Christian congregations for Arabic and Spanish speaking people in the Tulsa Metropolitan Area.  In 2007, the church began construction of a 1,200-seat auditorium with state-of-the-art audio-visual capabilities.

In 2014, Immanuel Baptist Church, located at the eastern edge of downtown Tulsa, joined the Church at Battle Creek as a satellite congregation.  With the addition, the church had four sites, three in the Tulsa area and one in Wheaton, Illinois.  In 2015 the Church faced neighborhood opposition to a plan to expand its Midtown, Tulsa, campus.

Affiliation
The Church at BattleCreek is part of the Southern Baptist Convention. However, in general, The Church at BattleCreek employs more of a non-denominational approach and does not necessarily emphasize its Baptist affiliation.
Gracemont Baptist Church purchased the Outlet Mall in 1991.

References

External links
Official website

Evangelical churches in Oklahoma
Baptist churches in Oklahoma